is a Japanese director, animator, and character designer. He started working in the anime industry in 1989 with Patlabor: The Movie. In 2015, he made his directorial debut with Ghost in the Shell: Arise.

Biography
Kazuchika Kise was born in Osaka on March 6, 1965. After graduating from High School, he joined AnimeR and studied under . Later, he joined Production I.G and was involved in his first project, Patlabor: The Movie. Following the film's release, Kise continued to work with Production I.G and started directing series with Ghost in the Shell: Arise in 2013.

In 2013, Kise did the character designs with Clamp for Blood-C, which won the Reaper Award for best animation that year. In 2018, Kise designed the characters for Made in Abyss, which won anime of the year at the Crunchyroll Anime Awards in the same year.

Works

TV series
 Blue Seed (1994–1998) (character designer)
 Otogi Zoshi (2004–2005) (character designer)
 xxxHolic (2006–2008) (character designer)
 Blood-C (2011) (character designer with Clamp)
 Ghost in the Shell: Arise (2013–2015) (director)
 Made in Abyss (2017–present) (character designer)
 Platinum End (2021–2022) (second part director)

Films
 Blood: The Last Vampire (2000) (animation director)
 Blood-C: The Last Dark (2011) (character designer with Clamp)
 Ghost in the Shell: The New Movie (2015) (character designer)
 Fate/Grand Order - Divine Realm of the Round Table: Camelot (2020–2021) (character designer)

Original video animation
 The Heroic Legend of Arslan (1991) (animation director)
 Combustible Campus Guardress (1994) (character designer)

References

External links
 

1965 births
Anime character designers
Anime directors
Japanese animators
Japanese television directors
Living people
People from Osaka